An oxygen concentrator is a device that concentrates the oxygen from a gas supply (typically ambient air) by selectively removing nitrogen to supply an oxygen-enriched product gas stream. They are used industrially and as medical devices for oxygen therapy.

Two methods in common use are pressure swing adsorption and membrane gas separation.  Pressure swing adsorption (PSA) concentrators utilize multiple molecular sieves consisting of zeolite minerals that adsorbs pressurized nitrogen in fast cycles.

History  
Home medical oxygen concentrators were invented in the early 1970s, with the manufacturing output of these devices increasing in the late 1970s. Union Carbide Corporation and Bendix Corporation were both early manufacturers. Before that era, home medical oxygen therapy required the use of heavy high-pressure oxygen cylinders or small cryogenic liquid oxygen systems. Both of these delivery systems required frequent home visits by suppliers to replenish oxygen supplies. In the United States, Medicare switched from fee-for-service payment to a flat monthly rate for home oxygen therapy in the mid-1980s, causing the durable medical equipment (DME) industry to rapidly embrace concentrators as a way to control costs. This reimbursement change dramatically decreased the number of primary high pressure and liquid oxygen delivery systems in use in homes in the United States at that time. Oxygen concentrators became the preferred and most common means of delivering home oxygen. The number of manufacturers entering the oxygen concentrator market increased greatly as a result of this change. Union Carbide Corporation invented the molecular sieve in the 1950s which made these devices possible.  It also invented the first cryogenic liquid home medical oxygen systems in the 1960s.

How oxygen concentrators work 

Oxygen concentrators using pressure swing adsorption (PSA) technology are used widely for oxygen provision in healthcare applications, especially where liquid or pressurized oxygen is too dangerous or inconvenient, such as in homes or portable clinics. For other purposes, there are also concentrators based on nitrogen separation membrane technology.

An oxygen concentrator takes in air and removes nitrogen from it, leaving an oxygen-enriched gas for use by people requiring medical oxygen due to low oxygen levels in their blood. Oxygen concentrators provide an economical source of oxygen in industrial processes where they are also known as oxygen gas generators or oxygen generation plants.

Pressure swing adsorption 

These oxygen concentrators utilize a molecular sieve to adsorb gases and operate on the principle of rapid pressure swing adsorption of atmospheric nitrogen onto zeolite minerals at high pressure.  This type of adsorption system is therefore functionally a nitrogen scrubber leaving the other atmospheric gases to pass through, leaving oxygen as the primary gas remaining. PSA technology is a reliable and economical technique for small to mid-scale oxygen generation.  Cryogenic separation is more suitable at higher volumes and external delivery generally more suitable for small volumes.

At high pressure, the porous zeolite adsorbs large quantities of nitrogen, because of its large surface area and chemical characteristics.  The oxygen concentrator compresses air and passes it over zeolite, causing the zeolite to adsorb the nitrogen from the air.  It then collects the remaining gas, which is mostly oxygen, and the nitrogen desorbs from the zeolite under the reduced pressure to be vented.

An oxygen concentrator has an air compressor, two cylinders filled with zeolite pellets, a pressure-equalizing reservoir, and some valves and tubes. In the first half-cycle, the first cylinder receives air from the compressor, which lasts about 3 seconds. During that time the pressure in the first cylinder rises from atmospheric to about 2.5 times normal atmospheric pressure (typically 20 psi/138 kPa gauge, or 2.36 atmospheres absolute) and the zeolite becomes saturated with nitrogen. As the first cylinder reaches near pure oxygen (there are small amounts of argon, CO2, water vapour, radon and other minor atmospheric components) in the first half-cycle, a valve opens and the oxygen-enriched gas flows to the pressure-equalizing reservoir, which connects to the patient's oxygen hose. At the end of the first half of the cycle, there is another valve position change so that the air from the compressor is directed to the second cylinder. The pressure in the first cylinder drops as the enriched oxygen moves into the reservoir, allowing the nitrogen to be desorbed back into gas. Partway through the second half of the cycle, there is another valve position change to vent the gas in the first cylinder back into the ambient atmosphere, keeping the concentration of oxygen in the pressure equalizing reservoir from falling below about 90%. The pressure in the hose delivering oxygen from the equalizing reservoir is kept steady by a pressure-reducing valve.

Older units cycled for a period of about 20 seconds and supplied up to 5 litres per minute of 90+% oxygen. Since about 1999, units capable of supplying up to 10 L/min have been available.

Classic oxygen concentrators use two-bed molecular sieves; newer concentrators use multi-bed molecular sieves. The advantage of the multi-bed technology is the increased availability and redundancy, as the 10 L/min molecular sieves are staggered and multiplied on several platforms. With this, over 960 L/min can be produced. The ramp-up time - the elapsed time until a multi-bed concentrator is producing oxygen at >90% concentration - is often less than 2 minutes, much faster than simple two-bed concentrators. This is a big advantage in mobile emergencies. The option, to fill standard oxygen cylinders (e.g. 50 L at 200 bar = 10,000 L each) with high-pressure boosters, to ensure automatic failover to previously filled reserve cylinders and to ensure the oxygen supply chain e.g. in case of power failure, is given with those systems.

Membrane separation 
In membrane gas separation, membranes act as a permeable barrier which different compounds move across at different rates or do not cross at all.

Applications 

Medical oxygen concentrators are used in hospitals or at home to concentrate oxygen for patients. PSA generators provide a cost-efficient source of oxygen. They are a safer, less expensive, and more convenient  alternative to tanks of cryogenic oxygen or pressurised cylinders. They can be used in various industries including medical, pharmaceutical production, water treatment and glass manufacture.

PSA generators are particularly useful in remote or inaccessible parts of the world or mobile medical facilities (military hospitals, disaster facilities).

Portable oxygen concentrators 

Since the early 2000s, many companies have produced portable oxygen concentrators. Typically, these devices produce the equivalent of one to five liters per minute of continuous oxygen flow and they use some version of pulse flow or "demand flow" to deliver oxygen only when the patient is inhaling. They can also provide pulses of oxygen either to provide higher intermittent flows or to reduce the power consumption.

Research into oxygen concentration is ongoing and modern techniques suggest that the amount of adsorbent required by medical oxygen concentrators can be potentially "reduced by a factor of three while offering ∼10–20% higher oxygen recovery compared to a typical commercial unit."

The FAA has approved the use of portable oxygen concentrators on commercial airlines. However, users of these devices should check in advance as to whether a particular brand or model is permitted on a particular airline. Unlike in commercial airlines, users of aircraft without cabin pressurization need oxygen concentrators which are able to deliver enough flowrate even at high altitudes.

Usually, "demand" or pulse-flow oxygen concentrators are not used by patients while they sleep. There have been problems with the oxygen concentrators not being able to detect when the sleeping patient is inhaling.  Some larger portable oxygen concentrators are designed to operate in a continuous-flow mode in addition to pulse-flow mode. Continuous-flow mode is considered safe for night use when coupled with a CPAP machine.

Alternate applications 
Repurposed medical oxygen concentrators or specialized industrial oxygen concentrators can be made to operate small oxyacetylene or other fuel gas cutting, welding and lampworking torches.

Application of A PSA Oxygen Generator in Industries

Oxygen is widely needed for the oxidation of different chemicals for industrial purposes. Previously, these industries purchased oxygen cylinders in large numbers to meet their requirements. But it was very expensive, and oxygen cylinders were not always available in the market.

Industries that need PSA oxygen generators for production

Paper industry

Oxygen is needed here for the bleaching of paper pulp with the help of the oxidation process to make the paper white. 
Moreover, lignin present in the wood is removed by the delignification process, which also needs oxygen.

Glass industry 

Huge furnaces are needed to melt the raw materials that combine to form glass. Oxygen flares up the furnace's fire to burn at a higher temperature needed for the production of glass.

Chemical industries

Oxygen is needed for the oxidation of different chemicals to form the desired chemical substances. Waste chemical products are burnt down and destroyed in the incinerator with the help of oxygen. Thus, the continuous supply of a bulk amount of oxygen is essential, which is possible only by a PSA oxygen generator.

Safety 
In both clinical and emergency-care situations, oxygen concentrators have the advantage of not being as dangerous as oxygen cylinders, which can, if ruptured or leaking, greatly increase the combustion rate of fire. As such, oxygen concentrators are particularly advantageous in military or disaster situations, where oxygen tanks may be dangerous or unfeasible.

Oxygen concentrators are considered sufficiently foolproof to be supplied to individual patients as a prescription item for use in their homes. Typically they are used as an adjunct to CPAP treatment of severe sleep apnea. There also are other medical uses for oxygen concentrators, including COPD and other respiratory diseases.

People who depend upon oxygen concentrators for home care may have life-threatening emergencies if the electricity fails during a natural disaster.

Industrial oxygen concentrators 

Industrial processes may use much higher pressures and flows than medical units. To meet that need, another process, called vacuum swing adsorption (VSA), has been developed by Air Products. This process uses a single low-pressure blower and a valve that reverses the flow through the blower so that the regeneration phase occurs under a vacuum. Generators using this process are being marketed to the aquaculture industry. Industrial oxygen concentrators are often available in a much wider range of capacities than medical concentrators.

Industrial oxygen concentrators are sometimes referred to as oxygen generators within the oxygen and ozone industries to distinguish them from medical oxygen concentrators. The distinction is used in an attempt to clarify that industrial oxygen concentrators are not medical devices approved by the Food and Drug Administration (FDA) and they are not suitable for use as bedside medical concentrators. However, applying the oxygen generator nomenclature can lead to confusion. The term, oxygen generator, is a misnomer in that the oxygen is not generated as it is with a chemical oxygen generator, but rather it is concentrated from the air.

Non-medical oxygen concentrators can be used as feed gas to a medical oxygen system, such as the oxygen system in a hospital, though governmental approval is required, such as by the FDA, and additional filtering is generally required.

During the COVID-19 pandemic
The COVID-19 pandemic increased the demand for oxygen concentrators. During the pandemic open source oxygen concentrators were developed, locally manufactured – with prices below imported products – and used, especially during a COVID-19 pandemic wave in India.

See also

References 

Drug delivery devices
Medical equipment
Oxygen
Dosage forms
Industrial gases
Gas technologies